The Spain women's national artistic gymnastics team represents Spain in FIG international competitions.

History
Spain made their Olympic debut in 1960, in which they placed 16th as a team.  Only one Spanish woman has won an Olympic medal in gymnastics: Patricia Moreno won bronze on floor exercise at the 2004 Olympic Games.

Team competition results

Olympic Games
 1960 — 16th place
Elena Artamendi, Montserrat Artamendi, Rosa Balaguer, María del Carmen González, María Luisa Fernández, Renata Müller
 1984 — 9th place
Laura Muñoz, Ana Manso, Marta Artigas, Irene Martínez, Virginia Navarro, Margot Estévez
 1988 — 9th place
Laura Muñoz, Eva Rueda, Manuela Hervás, Lidia Castillejo, Nuria García, Nuria Belchi
 1992 — 5th place
Cristina Fraguas, Sonia Fraguas, Alicia Fernández, Eva Rueda, Ruth Rollán, Silvia Martínez
 1996 — 7th place
Mónica Martín, Joana Juárez, Mercedes Pacheco, Diana Plaza, Elisabeth Valle, Verónica Castro, Gemma Paz
 2000 — 4th place
Esther Moya, Sara Moro, Laura Martinez, Susana Garcia, Marta Cusido, Paloma Moro
 2004 — 5th place
Laura Campos, Tania Gener, Elena Gómez, Monica Mesalles, Patricia Moreno, Sara Moro
 2020 — 12th place
Laura Bechdejú, Marina González, Alba Petisco, Roxana Popa

World Championships
 2001 – 4th place
Sara Moro, Elena Gómez, Marta Cusidó, Esther Moya, Alba Planas, Ana Parera
 2003 – 5th place
Elena Gómez, Mónica Mesalles, Patricia Moreno, Sara Moro, Tania Gener, Lenika de Simone
 2006 – 8th place
Thais Escolar, Lenika de Simone, Laura Campos, Tania Gener, Patricia Moreno, Mélodie Pulgarín
 2007 – 15th place
Mercedes Alcaide, Laura Campos, Patricia Moreno, Mélodie Pulgarín, Naomi Ruiz Walker, Lenika de Simone
 2010 – 18th place
Ainhoa Carmona, Claudia Vila, Cristiana Mironescu, Cintia Rodríguez, Elena Zaldívar, Ana María Izurieta
 2011 – 12th place
Ainhoa Carmona, Silvia Colussi-Pelaez, Beatriz Cuesta, Ana María Izurieta, Claudia Menendez, Maria Paula Vargas
 2014 – 15th place
Ainhoa Carmona, Claudia Colom, Marta Costa, Ana Pérez, Roxana Popa, Cintia Rodríguez
 2015 – 17th place
Claudia Colom, Nora Fernández, Ana Pérez, Roxana Popa, Natalia Ros, Maria Paula Vargas
 2018 – 18th place
Laura Bechdeju, Helena Bonilla, Ana Pérez, Paula Raya, Cintia Rodriguez
 2019 – 12th place
Marina González, Ana Pérez, Alba Petisco, Roxana Popa, Cintia Rodríguez
 2022 – 17th place
Laura Casabuena, Emma Fernandez, Maia Llacer, Laia Masferrer, Paula Raya

Senior roster

Most decorated gymnasts
This list includes all Spanish female artistic gymnasts who have won a medal at the Olympic Games or the World Artistic Gymnastics Championships.

See also 
 List of Olympic female artistic gymnasts for Spain

References

Gymnastics in Spain
National women's artistic gymnastics teams
Gymnastics